Edward Gamage was a Welsh Anglican priest in the 17th century.

Langley was born at St Brides Major and educated at St Edmund Hall, Oxford. He held livings at Coychurch, Peterstone and Ogmore.  Langford was Archdeacon of Llandaff from 1668  until 1670; when he was succeeded by his son Thomas. He died in 1686.

Notes

1686 deaths
17th-century Welsh Anglican priests
Archdeacons of Llandaff
Alumni of St Edmund Hall, Oxford
People from the Vale of Glamorgan